Roy Gerson is an American jazz pianist. He appeared in the movies The Cotton Club, Crimes and Misdemeanors, and The Mirror Has Two Faces and The Associate.

Gerson released That Gerson Person in 1991 and Gerson Swings Disney in 2001.

Gerson's song "If I Had You" appeared in the 1999 film Eyes Wide Shut. Gerson was also involved in the production of the soundtrack for the film.

Gerson and his band the Roy Gerson Swingtet performed live in jazz clubs in Manhattan, New York during the 1990s at venues such as the Village Gate, Blue Note, Tavern on the Green, and played for two years at Zanzibar.

References

American jazz pianists
American male pianists
Year of birth missing (living people)
Place of birth missing (living people)
Living people
21st-century American pianists
21st-century American male musicians
American male jazz musicians
Widespread Depression Jazz Orchestra members